Alexandra-Larisa Florian (born 8 August 1995) is a Romanian-born Azerbaijani judoka.

She is the bronze medallist of the 2017 Judo World Masters in the -52 kg category.

References

External links
 

1995 births
Living people
Sportspeople from Oradea
Romanian female judoka
Azerbaijani female judoka
Azerbaijani people of Romanian descent
Romanian emigrants to Azerbaijan
Naturalized citizens of Azerbaijan
European Games competitors for Romania
Judoka at the 2015 European Games
European Games competitors for Azerbaijan
Judoka at the 2019 European Games